Rodolfo is a given name. Notable people with the name include:

Rodolfo (footballer, born 1989), Rodolfo Xavier Neves, Brazilian striker
Rodolfo (footballer, born 1991), Rodolfo Alves de Melo, Brazilian goalkeeper
Rodolfo (footballer, born 1992), Rodolfo José da Silva Bardella, Brazilian forward
Rodolfo (footballer, born May 1993), Rodolfo de Almeida Guimarães, Brazilian attacking midfielder
Rodolfo (footballer, born October 1993), Rodolfo Freitas da Silva, Brazilian forward
Rodolfo Albano III, Filipino politician
Rodolfo Vera Quizon Sr. (1928-2012), Filipino actor and comedian better known as Dolphy.
Rodolfo Bodipo (born 1977), naturalized Equatoguinean football striker
Rodolfo Dantas Bispo (born 1982), Brazilian footballer
Rodolfo Camacho (born 1975), Colombian road cyclist
Rodolfo Escalera (born 1929), Mexican American Oil Painter who specialized in realism
Rodolfo Fariñas (born 1951), Filipino politician
Rudy Fernández (basketball) (born 1985), Spanish basketball player
Rodolfo Graziani (born 1882), Italian military officer
Rodolfo Jiménez (born 1972), Mexican actor and television host
Rodolfo Landeros Gallegos (born 1931), Mexican politician
Rodolfo Manzo (born 1949), Peruvian footballer
Rodolfo Martín Villa (born 1934), Spanish politician
Rodolfo Massi (born 1965), Italian road bicycle racer
Rodolfo Miguens (born 1976), Portuguese footballer and coach
Rodolfo (footballer, born 1997), Brazilian footballer Rodolfo Tito de Moraes
Rodolfo Morandi (1902–1955), Italian politician
Fito Páez, Argentine musician Rodolfo Páez Ávalos
Rodolfo Pereira de Castro (born 1995), Brazilian footballer
Rodolfo Pérez (field hockey) (born 1967), Argentine field hockey player
Rodolfo Pizarro (born 1994), Mexican footballer
Rodolfo Rodríguez (Uruguayan footballer) (born 1956), Uruguayan footballer
Rodolfo Santos Soares (born 1985), Brazilian footballer
Rodo Sayagues, Uruguayan screenwriter, producer, lyricist, actor and director
Rudolph Valentino (born 1895), Italian actor born Rodolfo Valentino
Rodolfo Neri Vela (born 1952), Mexican astronaut
Rodolfo Vieira (fighter) (born 1989), Brazilian practitioner of Brazilian jiu-jitsu
Rodolfo Zelaya (born 2000), Salvadoran footballer
Rodolfo Zapata (born 1966), American  coach and former footballer
Rodolfo Zapata (singer) (1932–2019), Argentine singer, songwriter, musician and actor

Fictional characters
Rodolfo the poet, the leading male character in La bohème by Giacomo Puccini
A character in Luisa Miller by Giuseppe Verdi
Rodolfo "Rudi", a character in Cocaine Godmother

See also
Rudolph (disambiguation)

Italian masculine given names
Spanish masculine given names
Portuguese masculine given names
Italian names of Germanic origin